Qasemabad (also Romanized as Qāsemābād) is a village in Qolqol Rud Rural District, Qolqol Rud District, Tuyserkan County, Hamadan Province, Iran. At the 2006 census, its population was 578, in 125 families.

References 

Populated places in Tuyserkan County